Ryszard Słapczyński (born 1934) is a Polish and Australian animation director and screenwriter.

Selected animated filmography 
 1969: Georgie to the Rescue
 1969-1971: The Strange Adventures of Matołek the Billy-Goat (Dziwne przygody Koziołka Matołka)
 1971: Czarna krowa w kropki bordo...
 1970: Kochajmy straszydła
 1972–1976: Pies, kot i... 
 1977 - A journey to the center of the Earth
1979: Off on a Comet
 1982: Oliver Twist
 1987: Alice Through the Looking Glass
 1991: Ali Baba 
 1996: Beauty and the Beast
 1997: Camelot (animated)

Awards 
1973: International Young Audience Film Festival "Ale Kino!" (Poznań) - Silver Goats (for an animated film Czarna krowa w kropki bordo...)

References

External links 
 
 Ryszard Słapczyński at filmpolski.pl

1934 births
Australian animators
Australian screenwriters
Polish animators
Polish screenwriters
Polish animated film directors
Australian animated film directors
Living people